"Promises" is a song by Christian rock band 7eventh Time Down from their third album, God Is on the Move. It was released in 2015 as the album's second single.

Charts

2015 songs
7eventh Time Down songs